Đinh Thị Thùy Dung (born 25 August 1998) is a Vietnamese footballer who plays as a midfielder for Women's Championship club Than Khoáng Sản and the Vietnam women's national team.

References

1998 births
Living people
Women's association football midfielders
Vietnamese women's footballers
Vietnam women's international footballers
21st-century Vietnamese women